Painaw may refer to:

Painavu, Kerala, India
Painaw, Myanmar